James Brand Pinker (1863 –  February 8, 1922) was a literary agent who represented James Joyce, Joseph Conrad, Henry James, Stephen Crane, and many of the other leading British and American writers of the age. He is considered to be one of the first literary agents in the modern sense and to have placed relations between authors and publishers on a more professional and fair basis.

Joseph Conrad engaged Pinker as his agent in August 1899. His novella Typhoon, which was published in The Pall Mall Magazine was the first piece of writing by Conrad to be handled by Pinker. Conrad's engagement of an agent to represent him was seen as violating a gentlemanly code of conduct by William Blackwood, publisher of Blackwood's Edinburgh Magazine, the periodical in which several of Conrad's important early works, including Heart of Darkness, had been published.

Following J. B. Pinker's death, his sons Eric Seabrooke Pinker (1891–1973) and James Randolph Pinker (1900–1959) took over the literary agency, which they ran with less success than their father (the business failed in 1944).

References 

 

1863 births
1922 deaths
Literary agents
People from London